The Saturn Awards are American awards presented annually by the Academy of Science Fiction, Fantasy and Horror Films. The awards were created to honor science fiction, fantasy, and horror in film, but have since grown to reward other films belonging to genre fiction, as well as television and home media releases. The Saturn Awards were created in 1973 and were originally referred to as Golden Scrolls.

History
The Saturn Awards were devised by Donald A. Reed in 1973, who felt that work in films in the genre of science fiction at that time lacked recognition within the established Hollywood film industry's award system. Initially, the award given was a Golden Scroll certificate. In the late 1970s, the award was changed to be a representation of the planet Saturn, with its ring(s) composed of film.

The Saturn Awards are voted upon by members of the presenting Academy. The Academy is a non-profit organization with membership open to the public. Its president and executive producer is Robert Holguin, and producer/writers Bradley Marcus and Kevin Marcus. Its members include filmmakers J. J. Abrams, Bryan Singer, Steven Spielberg, Bryan Fuller, Mark A. Altman, Vince Gilligan and James Cameron, among others.

Although the Awards still primarily focus on films and television in the science fiction, fantasy and horror categories, the Saturns have also recognized productions in other dramatic genres. There are also special awards for lifetime achievement in film production.

Award categories

Film

Television

Streaming 
 Best Streaming Limited Event Television Series (since 2022)
 Best Streaming Action/Adventure Television Series (since 2022)
 Best Streaming Fantasy Television Series (since 2022)
 Best Streaming Horror & Thriller Series (since 2019)
 Best Streaming Science Fiction Television Series (since 2022)
 Best Actor in a Streaming Television Series (since 2019)
 Best Actress in a Streaming Television Series (since 2019)
 Best Supporting Actor in a Streaming Television Series (since 2019)
 Best Supporting Actress in a Streaming Television Series (since 2019)
 Best Performance by a Younger Actor in a Streaming Television Series (since 2022)
 Best Guest-Starring Performance in a Streaming Television Series (since 2022)

Home video 
 Best DVD or Blu-ray Release (since 2001)
 Best DVD or Blu-ray Special Edition Release (since 2001)
 Best Classic Film DVD Release (2002)
 Best Television DVD Release (since 2002)
 Best DVD or Blu-ray Collection (since 2003)
 Best Retro Television Series on DVD (since 2014)

Special awards 
 The George Pal Memorial Award
 The Life Career Award
 The President's Memorial Award
 Special Recognition Award
 Breakthrough Performance Award

Discontinued awards 
 Best Low-Budget Film (1980–1982)
 Best Network Television Series (1988–2014)
 Best Guest Starring Role on Television (2008-2021)
 Best Performance by a Younger Actor on Television (2013-2021)
 Best Streaming Science Fiction, Action & Fantasy Series (2019)
 Best Streaming Superhero Series (2017-18)
 Best Superhero Television Series (since 2014-2021)
 Best Syndicated/Cable Television Series (1996–2014)
 Best International Series (2007)
 Best Youth-Oriented Television Series (2011–2014)
 Best New Media Television Series (2015–2017)
 Best Television Presentation (1994-2020)

Records

Notes

Year-by-year results 
The year indicates the year of release of the films eligible.

 1972: 1st Saturn Awards
 1973: 2nd Saturn Awards
 1974–1975: 3rd Saturn Awards
 1976: 4th Saturn Awards
 1977: 5th Saturn Awards
 1978: 6th Saturn Awards
 1979: 7th Saturn Awards
 1980: 8th Saturn Awards
 1981: 9th Saturn Awards
 1982: 10th Saturn Awards
 1983: 11th Saturn Awards
 1984: 12th Saturn Awards
 1985: 13th Saturn Awards
 1986: 14th Saturn Awards
 1987: 15th Saturn Awards
 1988: 16th Saturn Awards
 1989–1990: 17th Saturn Awards
 1991: 18th Saturn Awards
 1992: 19th Saturn Awards
 1993: 20th Saturn Awards
 1994: 21st Saturn Awards
 1995: 22nd Saturn Awards
 1996: 23rd Saturn Awards
 1997: 24th Saturn Awards
 1998: 25th Saturn Awards
 1999: 26th Saturn Awards
 2000: 27th Saturn Awards
 2001: 28th Saturn Awards
 2002: 29th Saturn Awards
 2003: 30th Saturn Awards
 2004: 31st Saturn Awards
 2005: 32nd Saturn Awards
 2006: 33rd Saturn Awards
 2007: 34th Saturn Awards
 2008: 35th Saturn Awards
 2009: 36th Saturn Awards
 2010: 37th Saturn Awards
 2011: 38th Saturn Awards
 2012: 39th Saturn Awards
 2013: 40th Saturn Awards
 2014: 41st Saturn Awards
 2015: 42nd Saturn Awards
 2016: 43rd Saturn Awards
 2017: 44th Saturn Awards
 2018–2019: 45th Saturn Awards
 2019–2020: 46th Saturn Awards
 2021–2022: 47th Saturn Awards

See also
 Hugo Award
 Nebula Award
 Scream Awards

References

External links
 
 

 
P
Awards established in 1972
Fantasy awards
Mass media science fiction awards
Science fiction awards